Vinson Flores "Vinnie" Sablan is a Northern Marianan politician who served as a member of the Northern Mariana Islands Senate from the 3rd district. Previously an independent, Sablan became a member of the Republican Party in July 2021. Sablan was a candidate for lieutenant governor of the Northern Mariana Islands in the 2022 gubernatorial election.

References 

Living people
Northern Mariana Islands Senators
Republican Party (Northern Mariana Islands) politicians
Year of birth missing (living people)